Jason Nicolle (born 4 November 1965) is a former English professional squash player.

Jason was born in London and represented Hampshire at county level. He was part of the English team that competed at the 1989 Men's World Team Squash Championships and 1991 Men's World Team Squash Championships.

References

External links
 

English male squash players
1965 births
Living people
Sportspeople from London
Hampshire cricketers
20th-century English people